Acceleration Team Portugal is the Portuguese team of Formula Acceleration 1, an international racing series. They are run by Team Ghinzani, owned by Piercarlo Ghinzani.

History

2014 season 
Drivers: Armando Parente, Sergio Campana

The team announced Armando Parente as their driver for the inaugural Formula Acceleration 1 round in Portimao. He moved to the Chinese team for round 2 in Navarra and was replaced by Sergio Campana.

Drivers

Complete Formula Acceleration 1 Results

References 

Portugal
National sports teams of Portugal
Portuguese auto racing teams